Juan Carlos Blanco Acevedo (6 December 1879 – 3 May 1952) was a Uruguayan politician.

Background

A lawyer by profession, he was from a distinguished Uruguayan political family. His father Juan Carlos Blanco Fernández was Foreign Minister of Uruguay in the late 19th century. His brother Daniel Blanco Acevedo was a Deputy for Montevideo. His nephew Juan Carlos Blanco Estradé was to be Foreign Minister of Uruguay.

Political role and office

Juan Carlos Blanco Acevedo was a prominent member of the Uruguayan Colorado Party.

He was Foreign Minister of Uruguay 1924-1926 under the Presidency of José Serrato.

See also

 Politics of Uruguay
 List of political families

References

University of the Republic (Uruguay) alumni
20th-century Uruguayan lawyers
Foreign ministers of Uruguay
1879 births
1952 deaths
Colorado Party (Uruguay) politicians
Ambassadors of Uruguay to Argentina
Ambassadors of Uruguay to Brazil
Ambassadors of Uruguay to the United States